In mathematics, in functional analysis, several different wavelets are known by the name Poisson wavelet.  In one context, the term "Poisson wavelet" is used to denote a family  of wavelets labeled by the set of positive integers,  the members of which are associated with the  Poisson probability distribution. These wavelets were first defined  and studied by Karlene A. Kosanovich, Allan R. Moser and Michael J. Piovoso in 1995–96. In another context, the term refers to a certain wavelet which involves a form of  the Poisson integral kernel. In still another context, the terminology is used to describe a family of complex wavelets indexed by positive integers which are connected with the derivatives of the Poisson integral kernel.

Wavelets associated with Poisson probability distribution

Definition

For each positive integer n the Poisson wavelet  is defined by

To see the relation between the Poisson wavelet and the Poisson distribution let X be a discrete random variable having the Poisson distribution with parameter (mean) t and, for each non-negative integer n, let Prob(X = n) = pn(t). Then we have

The Poisson wavelet  is now given by

Basic properties
 is the backward difference of the values of the Poisson distribution: 

The "waviness" of the members of this wavelet family follows from

Poisson wavelet is  not an orthogonal family of wavelets.

Poisson wavelet transform
The Poisson wavelet family can be used to construct the family of Poisson wavelet transforms of functions defined the time domain. Since the Poisson wavelets satisfy the admissibility condition also, functions in the time domain can be reconstructed from their Poisson wavelet transforms using the formula for inverse continuous-time wavelet transforms.

If f(t) is a function in the time domain its n-th Poisson wavelet transform is given by

In the reverse direction, given the n-th Poisson wavelet transform  of a function f(t) in the time domain, the function f(t) can be reconstructed as follows:

Applications
Poisson wavelet transforms have been applied in multi-resolution analysis, system identification, and parameter estimation. They are particularly useful in studying problems in which the functions in the time domain consist of linear combinations of decaying exponentials with time delay.

Wavelet associated with Poisson kernel

Definition
The Poisson wavelet is defined by the function

This can be expressed in the form

 where .

Relation with Poisson kernel
The function  appears as an integral kernel in the solution of a certain initial value problem of the Laplace operator.

, and

The problem has the following solution: There is exactly one function  satisfying the two conditions  and it is given by

where  and where "" denotes the convolution operation. The function  is the integral kernel for the function . The function  is the harmonic continuation of  into the upper half plane.

Properties
The "waviness" of the function follows from
.

.

The admissibility constant is

A class of complex wavelets associated with the Poisson kernel

Definition
The Poisson wavelet is a family of  complex valued functions indexed by the set of positive integers and defined by
 where

Relation with Poisson kernel
The function  can be expressed as an n-th derivative as follows:

Writing the function   in terms of the Poisson integral kernel  as 

we have

Thus  can be interpreted as a function proportional to the derivatives of the Poisson integral kernel.

Properties

where  is the unit step function.

References

Wavelets
Time–frequency analysis
Signal processing
Continuous wavelets
Poisson distribution